was an innovative Japanese publisher specializing in books in European languages on Japanese subjects. Hasegawa employed leading foreign residents as translators and noted Japanese artists as illustrators, and became a leading purveyor of export books and publications for foreign residents in Japan.

Beginnings

Hasegawa's earliest known books were published under the "Kobunsha" imprint in the mid-1880s but around 1889 he began publishing under the names "T. Hasegawa" and "Hasegawa & Co." Early publications included a monochrome woodcut illustrated Hokusai collection and a two volume Writings of Buddha (Kobunsha, 1884).

Many of Hasegawa's early books were in the form of chirimen-bon (ちりめん本) or crêpe paper books.

Japanese Fairy Tale Series 

In 1885, Hasegawa published the first six volumes of his Japanese Fairy Tale Series, employing American Presbyterian missionary Rev. David Thomson as translator. As the series proved profitable, Hasegawa added other translators beginning with James Curtis Hepburn for the seventh volume, including Basil Hall Chamberlain, Lafcadio Hearn, and Chamberlain's friend Kate James, wife of his Imperial Japanese Naval Academy colleague, Thomas H. James. The books were illustrated by Kobayashi Eitaku until his death in 1890, and by various other artists afterwards.

By 1903, the series reached 28 volumes in two series. Most of the stories were based on well-known Japanese folk tales, but some of the later books, including several by Lafcadio Hearn, are thought to have been invented rather than translated, or perhaps combine elements of several folk tales. The books continued to be reprinted, sometimes with variant titles, for several decades.

The two series of fairy tale books were also packaged into various types of sets. In 1922 an additional Lafcadio Hearn title, The Fountain of Youth was added, and a five volume Hearn set was sold. Princess Splendor: The Woodcutter's Daughter, a translation of Taketori monogatari by American missionary Edward Rothesay Miller, was presumably excluded from the series because of its greater length. A three volume series of Aino Fairy Tales translated by Basil Hall Chamberlain, consisting of The Hunter in Fairy-Land, The Birds' Party, and The Man Who Lost His Wife, was also issued in 1887.

Many of the fairy tale books appeared in other European language translations, including French, German, Spanish, Portuguese, and Swedish.

Other publications

Besides the popular fairy tale books, Hasegawa produced other books for Japan's tourist trade and foreign community. Many, like his illustrated calendars with humorous verses, were of an ephemeral nature. There were also translations of Japanese poetry, including the three volume series, Sword and Blossom: Poems from Japan translated by Charlotte Peake and Kimura Shotaro (1907-1910), collections of prints by famous artists such as Hiroshige and Hokusai, and illustrated books on Japanese life and customs, such as Japanese Pictures of Japanese Life (1895), Japanese Topsyturvydom by Mrs. E.S. Patton (1896), and The Favorite Flowers of Japan, with text by Mary E. Unger and illustrations by Mishima Shoso (1901).

References
Citations

Bibliography

 Riccardo, Franci (2008) Takejiro Hasegawa e le fiabe giapponesi del Museo Stibbert, Livorno,

External links

The Hasegawa Typeface History and downloadable version of his font
Video about Hasegawa's crepe books by David Bull (30 mins)

Book publishing companies of Japan